Radosław Majdan (born 10 May 1972) is a Polish television personality, football commentator and former politician, model and footballer who played as a goalkeeper.

Career

Playing career

Club
Majdan was born in Szczecin and started at hometown club Pogoń.

He moved on abroad playing for Göztepe Izmir, PAOK FC, Bursaspor and F.C. Ashdod.

He came back to the then sporting powerhouse Wisła Kraków, before ending his career back at Pogoń and Polonia Warsaw.

International
In total, he played seven matches for the Poland national team. The first was on 26 January 2000 (notably he played against U.S. in the 2002 FIFA World Cup).

Political and directorial career
Between 2006-2010 he was a member of the West Pomeranian Regional Assembly. He retired in May 2010, becoming the sports director of his last club Polonia Warsaw.

Television career

He took part in numerous television game shows and contests on Polish television, and frequently featured in gossip and tabloid newspapers.

He later went on to become a football pundit and commentator.

Statistics

International

Personal life
He has many tattoos, including the logo of Pogoń across his left chest.

Majdan and his ex-wife "Doda" (Dorota Rabczewska), a popular Polish pop singer, were called the "Polish Beckhams."

References

External links
 Official site 
 

1972 births
Living people
Polish footballers
Pogoń Szczecin players
F.C. Ashdod players
Göztepe S.K. footballers
Wisła Kraków players
PAOK FC players
2002 FIFA World Cup players
Poland international footballers
Sportspeople from Szczecin
Ekstraklasa players
Super League Greece players
Süper Lig players
Israeli Premier League players
Polish expatriate footballers
Expatriate footballers in Israel
Expatriate footballers in Turkey
Expatriate footballers in Greece
Association football goalkeepers